The Federal College of Education (Technical), Akoka (formerly National Technical Teachers College) is a Nigerian technical tertiary institution located in Akoka, a suburb of Yaba in Lagos. Founded in 1967 by the Federal Government of Nigeria, the institution was founded with the aim of "grooming and producing teachers in technical, vocational and commercial academic disciplines". The Federal College of Education (Technical), Akoka is approved by the National Universities Commission and offers the award of Nigeria Certificate in Education (NCE) and undergraduate first degree courses in technology education, having affiliated to the Federal University of Technology, Minna.

Courses 
The following courses are offered by the College of Education;

 Agricultural Science
Agricultural Science and Education
Automobile Technology Education
Biology/Integrated Science
Building Education
Business Education
Chemistry/Integrated Science
Computer Education/Physics
Computer Education/Chemistry
Computer Science Education/Integrated Science
Computer Science Education/Mathematics
The institution also participates in the SIWES programme where students are attached to practitioners in the industry to gain practical experience.

Affiliation 
The institution is affiliated with the University of Benin, Benin City for offering bachelor's degree programmes in the following areas:

Department of Vocational and Technical Education

 Agriculture Education
 Business Education
 Home Economics Education
 Technical Education with options in;

- Automobile Technology Education

- Building/Woodwork Technology Education

- Metal Work Technology Education

- Electrical/Electronics Technology Education

Department of Curriculum and Instructional Technology

 Biology Education
 Chemistry Education
 Computer Science Education
 Mathematics Education
 Physics Education
 Integrated Science Education
 Educational Technology Education

Department of Educational Foundation

 Fine and Applied Arts Education

The institution is also affiliated with the federal University of Technology, Minna.

Notable alumni

 Ude Oko Chukwu

See also
List of colleges of education in Nigeria
National Commission for Colleges of Education

References

External links
Official website

1967 establishments in Nigeria
Universities and colleges in Lagos
Federal colleges of education in Nigeria
Educational institutions established in 1967